The 1941 Penn State Nittany Lions football team was an American football team that represented the Pennsylvania State College as an independent during the 1941 college football season. In its 12th season under head coach Bob Higgins, the team compiled a 7–2 record and outscored opponents by a total of 200 to 78. The team played its home games in New Beaver Field in State College, Pennsylvania.

Penn State's Len Krouse was selected by the Associated Press as a second-team back on the 1941 All-Eastern football team.

Schedule

References

Penn State
Penn State Nittany Lions football seasons
Penn State Nittany Lions football